Sposito is an Italian surname. Notable people with the surname include:

Carlo Sposito (1924–1984), Italian actor
Raffaele Sposito (1922–1981), better known as Faele, Italian playwright, screenwriter, and lyricist

See also
Sposato

Italian-language surnames